Teenage Snuff Film is the first solo album by Rowland S. Howard. Former The Birthday Party bandmate Mick Harvey contributes drums, organ and guitar, while Brian Hooper of The Beasts of Bourbon features on bass guitar. It contains eight original songs, and two cover versions: "White Wedding" by Billy Idol, and "She Cried" (previously performed by The Shangri-Las, Johnny Thunders, and others).

The album was produced, mixed and mastered by Lindsay Gravina at Birdland Studios in Prahran and Sing Sing Recording Studios in  Cremorne.

The album was reissued as a limited edition double LP in October 2011, with minor track listing changes.

Remastered versions of both Howard's solo albums were released by Mute Records in Europe, Fat Possum in America and Bloodlines in Australia on 27 March 2020.

Reception 

Teenage Snuff Film was well received by critics. The album was praised for its "dark dramatic sounds" and went on to become one of the most acclaimed and influential Australian releases of the 1990s.

Influence 

In a Reddit AMA, Against Me! lead singer Laura Jane Grace named Teenage Snuff Film as her favourite album of all time.

Track listing
All songs written by Rowland S. Howard, except where noted.
"Dead Radio" 
"Breakdown (And Then...)" 
"She Cried" (Greg Richards, Ted Daryll)
"I Burnt Your Clothes" 
"Exit Everything" (Rowland S. Howard, Brian Hooper)
"Silver Chain" (Genevieve McGuckin, Rowland S. Howard)
"White Wedding" (Billy Idol)
"Undone"
"Autoluminescent"
"Shut Me Down" - vinyl only
"Sleep Alone" (Rowland S. Howard, Brian Hooper)

Personnel
 Rowland S. Howard – vocals, guitar
 Mick Harvey – drums, organ; rhythm guitar on "Sleep Alone"
 Brian Hooper – bass guitar
with:
Genevieve McGuckin – organ on "Silver Chain"
Steve Boyle – drums on "Autoluminescent"
Andrew Entsch, Jen Anderson, Robin Casinader – strings

Technical
Lindsay Gravina – producer, session engineer, mixing engineer, mastering engineer
James Masson – assistant engineer
Jade Martin – assistant engineer
Rowland S. Howard, Genevieve McGuckin – cover

Charts

References

External links
http://rowland-s-howard.com/discog/rsh-solo.php
 Rowland S. Howard on Myspace

1999 debut albums
Cooking Vinyl albums
Rowland S. Howard albums